The Nuurst Khotgor Coal Mine (Coal bowl) is an open-pit coal mine, located about 80 km west of the Uvs Province capital Ulaangom and 25 km south of Üüreg Lake in Bökhmörön sum (district) of Uvs Province in western Mongolia.

The mine has coal reserves amounting to 109 million tonnes of coking coal, one of the largest coal reserves in Asia and the world. The mine has an annual production capacity of 1 million tonnes of coal.

Originally the mine was state property, but has been privatized in 2001. In 2010 Korea Coal Corporation acquired 51% of the business.

References 

Populated places in Mongolia
Surface mines in Mongolia
Coal mines in Mongolia